The George Collins Love House is a historic house in Memphis, Tennessee. It was built for its namesake, the interim mayor of Memphis in 1915–1916. It is listed on the National Register of Historic Places.

History
The house was built in 1889 for George Collins Love, a businessman who served on the Memphis City Council. He also served as the interim mayor of Memphis from November 4, 1915, to February 12, 1916, until his ally, E. H. Crump, regained his office.

Architectural significance
The house was designed in the Victorian architectural style. It has been listed on the National Register of Historic Places since April 2, 1979.

References

Houses on the National Register of Historic Places in Tennessee
National Register of Historic Places in Shelby County, Tennessee
Victorian architecture in Tennessee
Houses completed in 1889